Croatia has had two adaptations of the singing competition Pop Idol under two different titles and on two different networks:

 Hrvatski Idol, which was aired from 2004–2005 on Nova TV
 Hrvatska traži zvijezdu, which premiered February 22, 2009 on RTL

Idols (franchise)
Television series by Fremantle (company)